Gerard King (born November 25, 1972) is an American former professional basketball player. He was a member of the San Antonio Spurs and the Washington Wizards in the National Basketball Association (NBA).

He played for the US national team in the 1998 FIBA World Championship, winning the bronze medal.

King attended and played college basketball at Nicholls State University in Louisiana, and finished his career as the fourth leading scorer and sixth leading rebounder in school history. He was inducted into the Louisiana Basketball Hall of Fame in 2006.

He was a member of the San Antonio Spurs' 1999 NBA championship team. Then he played his two final NBA seasons (1999–2001) for the Washington Wizards. In 126 games, he averaged 4.5 points and 3.1 rebounds.

Notes

External links
NBA.com player profile

1972 births
Living people
1998 FIBA World Championship players
American expatriate basketball people in Italy
American men's basketball players
Basketball players from New Orleans
Mens Sana Basket players
Nicholls Colonels men's basketball players
Power forwards (basketball)
Quad City Thunder players
San Antonio Spurs players
Undrafted National Basketball Association players
United States men's national basketball team players
Washington Wizards players